Cheli or Chali or Choli or Chaly in Iran, may refer to:
 Chali, Heris, East Azerbaijan Province
 Chali, Malekan, East Azerbaijan Province
 Cheli-ye Olya, Golestan Province
 Chali, Hamadan
 Choli, Khuzestan
 Chali, Kohgiluyeh and Boyer-Ahmad
 Chali, Kurdistan (چالي - Chālī)
 Chali, Mazandaran (چالي - Chālī)